Cyrus Cline (July 12, 1856 – October 5, 1923) was an American lawyer and politician who served four terms as a U.S. Representative from Indiana from 1909 to 1917.

Career overview
Born near Mansfield, Ohio, Cline moved to Steuben County, Indiana, in 1858 with his parents, who settled near Angola.
He attended the Angola High School, and was graduated from Hillsdale College, Michigan, in 1876.  Cline was the Superintendent of the schools of Steuben County 1877-1883.
He studied law, was admitted to the bar and began practice in Angola, Indiana, in 1884.

Congress 
Cline was elected as a Democrat to the Sixty-first and to the three succeeding Congresses, serving from March 4, 1909 to March 3, 1917.
He served as chairman of the Committee on Expenditures on Public Buildings during the Sixty-second Congress, from 1909 to 1911.
He was an unsuccessful candidate for reelection in 1916.

Later career and death 
After leaving office, he resumed the practice of law in Angola, where he died.

He was interred in Circle Hill Cemetery.

References

1856 births
1923 deaths
Hillsdale College alumni
People from Angola, Indiana
Democratic Party members of the United States House of Representatives from Indiana